Stephen Plog is a notable American archaeologist and anthropologist, who specializes in the pre-Columbian cultures of the American Southwest.  As the Commonwealth Professor of Anthropology at The University of Virginia, he currently teaches undergraduate and graduate students, and is working to digitize all the research on the Chaco Canyon through the Chaco Research Archive.  On May 1, 2006 he was elected to the National Academy of Sciences. Election to the academy is among the highest distinctions for a scientist, and is based on outstanding and ongoing achievements in original research.  He was also a visiting fellow at the School of American Research in Santa Fe, New Mexico in 2001-2002.

Plog's research focuses on understanding culture change in the prehistoric American Southwest. He is particularly interested in the changing nature of ritual, social organization, exchange and demography from approximately 1000 C.E. to the historic period.

Plog, who joined the U.Va. anthropology department as an assistant professor in 1978, is an archaeologist whose work focuses on understanding cultural change among prehistoric cultures in the American Southwest. His research on the Chaco Canyon region of northwestern New Mexico has changed several long-accepted ideas about early Native American peoples, ancestors of the Hopi, Zuni, and Rio Grande pueblos in Arizona and New Mexico, and what led to massive population shifts near the end of the 13th century.

Through a grant from the Mellon Foundation as well as a fellowship with U.Va.’s Institute for Advanced Technology in the Humanities, he and colleagues have created an online digital archive (www.chacoarchive.org) for several of the key excavated sites in the Chaco region.

Plog also has served as anthropology department chair at U.Va., director of undergraduate studies, and associate dean for academic programs in the College and Graduate School of Arts & Sciences.

His recent fieldwork in the Chevelon region of east central Arizona examines changing patterns of ritual, social relationships, and exchange ties during the 11th, 12th, and 13th centuries. Evidence for significant social conflict in the 11th and 12th centuries appears a century or more before similar patterns become common in the northern Southwest and has been a particular focus of his fieldwork. Continued surveys and excavations in the Chevelon region are planned for the next several years.

Books and publications 

1997 
 Ancient Peoples of the American Southwest. Thames and Hudson, LTD, London, England. .
 (with Julie Solometo) The ever changing and the never changing: the evolution of western pueblo ritual. Cambridge Archaeological Journal 7(2):161-182.

1996 
(with Michelle Hegmon) Regional social interaction in the northern southwest. In Interpreting Southwestern Diversity: Underlying Principles and Overarching Patterns, edited by P. R. Fish and J. J. Reid, pp. 23–34. Arizona State University Anthropological Papers No. 48.

1995 
 Paradigms and pottery: the analysis of production and exchange in the American Southwest. In The Organization of Ceramic Production in the American Southwest, edited by Barbara J. Mills and Patricia L. Crown, pp. 268–280. University of Arizona Press, Tucson.
 Equality and hierarchy: holistic approaches to understanding social dynamics in the Pueblo Southwest. In The Foundations of Social Inequality, edited by T. Douglas Price and Gary M. Feinman, pp. 189–206. Plenum, New York.
 Approaches to the study of style: complements and contrasts. In Style, Society, and Person, edited by Christopher Carr and Jill Neitzel, pp. 369–87. Plenum, New York.

1993 
 (with Michelle Hegmon) The sample size-richness relation: The relevance of research questions, sampling strategies, and behavioral variation. American Antiquity 58:489-496.

1991 
 Chronology construction and the study of prehistoric culture change. Journal of Field Archaeology. 17:439-456.

1990 
 Agriculture, Sedentism and Environment in the Evolution of Political Systems. In The Evolution of Political Systems. Steadman Upham, ed. pp. 177– 199. Cambridge: Cambridge University Press.

1980
 Stylistic Variation In Prehistoric Ceramics - Design Analysis in the American Southwest. Cambridge University Press, Cambridge, England.

External links

 University of Virginia Webpage  http://www.virginia.edu/anthropology/faculty/plog.html
 U.Va. Archaeologist Stephen Plog Elected to National Academy of Sciences
 School of American Research www.sarweb.org  https://web.archive.org/web/20060927082400/http://www.sarweb.org/scholars/scholars/individuals/scholars01-02/plog02.htm

American anthropologists
American archaeologists
Living people
Year of birth missing (living people)